The  was one of the oldest of the major Japanese clans (uji); and the clan retained its prominence during the Sengoku period and the Edo period.  The clan's origin is said to be one of the original clans of the Yamato people; they truly gained prominence during the Heian period (794-1185), and experienced a resurgence in the 18th century. Although Abe is also a very common Japanese surname in modern times, not everyone with this name is descended from this clan.

Origins and history
According to the Nihon Shoki, the Abe were descended from Prince Ōhiko, son of Emperor Kōgen.  They originated in Iga province (today Mie prefecture); Though the clan name was originally written as 阿倍, it changed to 安倍 around the 8th century. Though this origin is not positive, it is likely.

The northern region which would come to be known as the provinces of Mutsu and Dewa, was conquered by the Japanese sometime in the 9th century, and the native Emishi people there subjugated or displaced. While many provinces at this time were overseen primarily by a governor, Mutsu saw to the rise of independent families called gōzoku which administered local affairs.  The Abe were appointed as "Superintendent of the Aborigines" ostensibly to control the local people who by now were a mix of Japanese immigrants and former Emishi tribesmen on behalf of the central government, but in reality the government in Kyōto simply did not have control over the region, and was recognizing this fact by appointing the Abe. The Abe for their part used their position to take control over the so-called six districts roku-oku-gun located in what is now central Iwate prefecture surrounding the Kitakami river.  In time, they began to have disputes with the governor of Mutsu, an office held by a branch of the Fujiwara family, which erupted into violence in 1051.

The main reason given for the attack on the Abe was that they stopped paying taxes to Kyoto, and stopped contributing to the local government. The governors of Mutsu and the commander of Dewa fort combined their forces to attack the Abe, but were defeated.  Desperate to quell this affront to their authority Kyōto appointed Minamoto Yoriyoshi as Chinjufu-shōgun. The position known as Chinjufu-shōgun, or "Commander-in-chief of the Defense of the North", was traditionally given by the court as a temporary appointment to a courtier (typically of high rank) who was appointed as a national general to quell uprisings among the Emishi or Ebisu barbarians of northern Honshū. Increasingly, as military power became privatized, this position was rotated among a few clans.

In what has come to be termed the "Earlier Nine Years' War" (前九年合戦, Zenkunen kassen), Abe Yoritoki was killed, and his son Abe no Sadato defeated, by Minamoto no Yoriyoshi and his son, Minamoto no Yoshiie. This war broke the power of the Abe family, but in the prolonged fighting that took place the Minamoto would not have prevailed had it not been for the aid of another powerful family, the Kiyowara.  The Kiyowara clan of nearby Dewa province, aided the Minamoto in defeating the Abe.

Other Abe families
Though many other major figures throughout history have been called Abe, it is difficult to know which were related to the Abe clan of Iga and Mutsu. Abe no Nakamaro, a major court noble of the 8th century, for example, was from the town of Abe, near Nara, and derived his family name thus.

A family by the name of Abe also proved significant during the Edo period, serving successively in the post of Rōjū, or Elders, who advised the Tokugawa shōgun. Again, it is difficult to determine whether or not this line was directly related to the much earlier Abe clan, but it is of an importance itself nevertheless. Abe Tadaaki was the first to serve as Rōjū, holding the post from 1633-71. He was very likely a son or other direct relation to Abe Masatsugu (1569–1647) who served Tokugawa Ieyasu and fought under him at the decisive battle of Sekigahara. Other members of the Abe family would succeed Tadaaki to the post for much of the Edo period (1603–1867), ending with Abe Masahiro, who was chief of the Council of Rōjū at the time of the arrival of Commodore Perry.

Clan members of note
Abe no Hirafu (c. 575-664), also known as Abe no Ōmi, one of the leading generals in the subjugation of the Ainu
Abe no Yoritoki (died 1057) - Chinjufu-shōgun during the Zenkunen War
Abe no Sadato (1019–62)
Abe Masatsugu (1569–1647) - fought at Sekigahara, became a fudai daimyō under the Tokugawa
Abe Tadaaki - first Abe clan member of the Rōjū
Abe Masahiro - among the last of the Rōjū, signed Treaty of Kanagawa
Abe no Seimei - famed practitioner of onmyōdō

Notes

References
 Appert, Georges and H. Kinoshita. (1888).  Ancien Japon. Tokyo: Imprimerie Kokubunsha.
 Asakawa, Kan'ichi. (1903).    The Early Institutional Life of Japan. Tokyo: Shueisha. OCLC 4427686;  see online, multi-formatted, full-text book at openlibrary.org
 Nussbaum, Louis-Frédéric. (2002).  Japan Encyclopedia. Cambridge, Massachusetts: Harvard University Press.  
 Papinot, Edmund. (1906) Dictionnaire d'histoire et de géographie du japon. Tokyo: Librarie Sansaisha...Click link for digitized 1906 Nobiliaire du japon (2003)
 Sansom, George Bailey. (1958). A History of Japan to 1334. Stanford: Stanford University Press. 
 . (1961). A History of Japan: 1334-1615. Stanford, California: Stanford University Press.  
 . (1963). A History of Japan: 1615-1867. Stanford, California: Stanford University Press.  
 Turnbull, Stephen R. (1998). The Samurai Sourcebook. London: Arms & Armour Press. ; reprinted by Cassell & Co., London, 2000. 

 
Abe Clan
Samurai
Abe Clan
Abe Clan